Karainagar  (pronounced Kaarai-Nagar) is located 20 km from Jaffna, Sri Lanka, on the Karaitivu (Island). In Tamil, it means the many karai trees but also means the coast, as derived from the Tamil word 'kadar-karai' meaning a settlement (or town) on the sea coast (kadar or kadal means sea and karai means coast) which is borne by the fact that Karainagar is a coastal town. 

Karainagar island is about  area and the registered voters 20,000 voted in 1977 national election. The current population stands at 11,000. 30% of this land is used for paddy cultivation.

See also

Casuarina Beach 
Karaitivu (Island)

Towns in Jaffna District
Karainagar DS Division